Auchi Polytechnic is a Federal Polytechnic in Auchi, Edo State, Nigeria. It is one of the first four Polytechnics established in Nigeria.  It has over 10,000 students enrolled in business, technology, environmental and arts courses.

History 
Auchi Polytechnic was founded in 1963, first as a technical college which was a gift of the British government to the then Midwestern Region.  It offered courses only up to the Ordinary Diploma level in limited areas of engineering and business.  By the seventies, there was a need for skilled manpower at a higher level and in many more disciplines.  Thus in 1973, the Bendel State Government upgraded the technical college to a full-fledged polytechnic with the mandate to train skilled manpower up to the Higher National Diploma level in a broad range of engineering, science, environmental studies, business studies and art and design.

The extant law establishing it assigned to the institution the task of producing well trained and highly skilled middle level manpower for the national economy in the areas of engineering, applied sciences and technology, environmental studies, management studies, and art and industrial design. In 1994, the Federal Government took over the polytechnic from the Edo State Government.

Schools 
Source:

School of Applied Science & Technology (SAST)

Department of Food Technology
Department of Hospitality Management
Department of Science Laboratory 
Department of Ceramic Technology 
Department of Science Laboratory Technology

School of Art and Industrial Design (SAID)
Department of Graphics & Textile
Department of Painting & General Arts
Department of Sculpture & Ceramics

School of Business Studies (SBS)
Department of Accountancy
Department of Banking & Finance
Department of Business Administration & Management
Department of Marketing
Department of Public Administration

School of Engineering Technology (SENG)
Department of Agricultural Engineering
Department of Chemical Engineering Technology
Department of Civil Engineering
Department of Electrical/Electronics Engineering
Department of Mechanical Engineering
Department of Polymer Technology

School of Environmental Studies (SENV)
Department of Architectural Technology
Department of Building Technology
Department of Estate Management
Department of Quantity Surveying
Department of Survey & Geo-informatics
Department of Urban & Regional Planning

School of Information & Communication Technology (SICT)
Department of Computer Science
Department of Mass Communication
Department of Office Technology & Management
Department of Statistics

School of General Studies (This is a servicing school, it has no students of its own.)

Notable alumni

Hanks Anuku, Nigerian-Ghanaian actor.
Philipa Idogho, former Rector
Tom Ikimi, politician.
Paul Obazele, Nigerian actor

Academic excellence 
Since 2009, Auchi Polytechnic has consistently been rated amongst the top universities in Nigeria by Webometrics. It came number eleven in 2009 and in 2010 it moved up one point to the 10th position. By 2011 it became number two. Amongst the polytechnics, it has consistently remained the first in Nigeria, in West Africa, and the second in the whole of Africa.

The graduates of the school have distinguished themselves in their chosen fields, including business, finance, engineering, science, art and design.

In competitions amongst peers, the high standards show glaringly.  The polytechnic holds:
	The first prize in Polytechnic Expo of engineering designs and fabrications (2008 and 2012).
	The first prize in the Minna exhibition for crafts and wood works (2004)
	The NUXART prize for Art Works; the polytechnic won this prize three times consecutively.
	The school made a good showing at the Federal Ministry of Education organized exposition for all tertiary institutions in the country.  Its performance informed its invitation by the Federal Government to exhibit works again at the first African legislative summit held in 2013.
	At student level, the school's students have  distinguished themselves among their peers. At a national debate organized for tertiary institutions held at Abuja in 2009, Auchi Polytechnic won the first prize.  The following year, the school's students came second at the debate hosted by the University of Ibadan, where one of the school's representatives emerged as the best female speaker.
	In the area of environmental impact, Auchi Polytechnic embodies the Federal Government's commitment to providing entrepreneurial skills to students, as both short and long-term solutions to unemployment and under-employment.  The institution has been designated a centre of excellence for entrepreneurship studies.
 Closely related to this is the development of flexible skills initiative of the Commonwealth of Learning (COL).  Again, Auchi Polytechnic is foremost in this regard, being the only partner-institution with COL in Nigeria.  Thus, the institution runs short duration programmes in skills acquisition for interested members of the public.
 The polytechnic has institutionalized the culture of inaugural lectures which requires qualified chief lecturers to give a summation of their experience and research interest in their respective disciplines.

References

External links
 

1963 establishments in Nigeria
Education in Edo State
Educational institutions established in 1963
Federal polytechnics in Nigeria